Bier spots are small, light macules usually found on the arms and legs of young adults, in which the intervening skin may seem erythematous but blanches with pressure so that these light macules disappear.  This is a benign physiologic vascular anomaly of no significance clinically.

Diagnosis 
The spots appear when the blood is congested with a bandage on the upper arm, e.g. with a blood pressure cuff.

The spots also appear when the arms are slightly raised from the trunk (angle approx. 45°) and disappear again when the arms are stretched upwards.

Treatment 
It is a physiological phenomenon that requires no treatment.

See also
 Marshall–White syndrome
 List of cutaneous conditions

References

Further reading

Vascular-related cutaneous conditions